Barford & Perkins were road roller and agricultural machinery manufacturers in Peterborough, England. The original business began in 1840.  Their machinery was distributed internationally.

In 1920 it joined the engineering combine Agricultural & General Engineers (AGE) which failed in 1932. Barford & Perkins relocated from Peterborough at the end of the 1920s into part of the Aveling & Porter works in Rochester. Both companies made road rollers but the ranges were complementary, the Barford rollers were petrol-powered —the engines were made by Peter Brotherhood— and smaller than Aveling's steam-powered rollers.

At the instigation of chairman Edward Barford, Barford & Perkins's profitable business was bought from the AGE receiver along with Aveling & Porter with the support of Ruston & Hornsby, Ransomes, Sims & Jefferies and RA Lister & Company. 

Barford & Perkins and Aveling & Porter were combined in 1933 and moved to Grantham in 1934 and Aveling & Porter was renamed Aveling-Barford that same year.

References

External links

Manufacturing companies established in 1840
Manufacturing companies disestablished in 1934
1840 establishments in England
1932 mergers and acquisitions
1934 disestablishments in England